Shirin Su bathhouse or the Bathhouse of the Fresh Water is a historical monument located in the city of Shusha. It was built in 1878–1880 at the order of Khurshidbanu Natavan by the architect of Kerbelayi Sefikhan Garabaghy. On 2 August 2001, the Cabinet of Ministers of the Republic of Azerbaijan, by the Resolution No. 32, registered it as a historical monument of a republican significance.

History 
The Shirin Su bathhouse, one of the Shusha bathhouses, was built at the order of Khurshidbanu Natavan, the daughter of the last Karabakh khan, Mehdigulu Khan Javanshir, in 1878-1880s, by the architect Karbalayi Safikhan Karabakhi. The bath was called "Shirin Su" (fresh water) thanks to the fact that it used drinking water, which was brought to city, back in 1873, by Natavan. The bathhouse served men on the odd days of the week, and women on the even days. It functioned until the city of Shusha got under the control of the Armenian forces. After the end of the Karabakh War, the building of the bathhouse remained intact, however the interior decoration was changed by Armenians. The patterns and the ornaments on the dome and the hall's walls were completely destroyed. A swimming pool, not related to the bathhouse, was
built inside.

See also 
 Chokak Hamam
 Underground Bath
 Gasim bey Bath

References

Buildings and structures in Shusha
Karbalayi Safikhan Karabakhi buildings and structures
Baths of Azerbaijan